Veronica Andrèasson (born 6 March 1981) is a road cyclist from Sweden. She represented her nation at the 2005 and 2006 UCI Road World Championships.

References

External links
 profile at Procyclingstats.com

1981 births
Swedish female cyclists
Living people
Place of birth missing (living people)